John Moss may refer to:
John Moss (lawyer) (1890–1976), British social services worker
John Moss (Philadelphia) (1771–1847), Philadelphia merchant, Parnas (President) of Congregation Mikveh Israel involved in the Damascus Affair
John Moss (umpire) (1864–1950), English cricket umpire
John C. Moss (1838–1892), American inventor
John E. Moss (1915–1997),  U.S. Representative from California
John Francis Moss (1844-1907), Sheffield education pioneer
John Errington Moss (born 1940), Canadian author
John Henry Moss (1918–2009), American baseball executive and politician
John Thomas Moss (1839–1880), American frontiersman, prospector, and miner
Johnny Moss (1907–1995), American poker player
Jon Moss (born 1957), British rock drummer
J. McKenzie Moss (1868–1929), American politician and judge

See also
Jonathan Moss (disambiguation)
Johnny Most (1923–1993), Boston Celtics announcer